Lopen Karma Phuntsho is a former monk and Bhutanese scholar who specialises in Buddhism, Tibetan & Himalayan Studies and Bhutan, and has published a number of works including eight books, translations, book reviews and articles on Buddhism, Bhutan and Tibetan Studies. His The History of Bhutan has been called "the first book to offer a comprehensive history of Bhutan in English" and received Choice Outstanding Academic Title Award in 2015.

Early life 
He was born in Ura, in the Bumthang district of central Bhutan. He was born as the third child of the Tothchukpo House to his mother who is a scion of Gaden Lam family which traces its origin to Phajo Drukgom Zhigpo, the priest who brought Drukpa Kagyu tradition of Tibetan Buddhism to western Bhutan. Karma learnt basic Chokey alphabets and prayers from his father, who is an incarnate priest and farmer from the Tsakaling Choje family, a religious nobility which claims descent from Bhutan's foremost spiritual saint Pema Lingpa and Tarshong Chukpo, house of Ura. He attended Ura Primary School until Class III. Because the school did not have Class IV and he was too small to travel, his parents begged the headmaster to keep him in Ura and repeat. The following year, he travelled to Jakar School with a few friends. The headmaster at the new school mistakenly put Karma again in Class III. Karma today  humorously claims that he is perhaps the only person who studied in Class III for three years and received first prizes thrice. Karma spent most of his school winter breaks helping the family cow herder in the neighbouring district of Lhuntse. 

In 1986, he came to Thimphu and had a short spell at Yangchenphug Higher Secondary School before leaving school to become a monk and study Buddhism at Chagri Monastery. Later, he went to south India to continue his studies spending a year at Sera Monastery then ten years at the Ngagyur Nyingma Institute.  Since 1994, he has taught Buddhism and related subjects and has served a lecturer at the Ngagyur Nyingma Institute in Bylakuppe and for two years as an abbot at the Shugseb Nunnery in Dharamshala.

Education 
In 1997, partly he says because young Bhutanese educated in English looked down on monks even though they were very learned, he joined Balliol College Oxford and read for an M.St. in Sanskrit and Classical Indian Religions under Richard Gombrich and Michael Aris, with additional supervision by David Seyfort Ruegg. In 2003, he received a D.Phil. in Buddhist Studies from Oxford University. He worked as a post-doctoral researcher in CNRS, Paris and as a research associate in the Department of Social Anthropology, Cambridge University. He was also the Spalding Fellow in Comparative Religions at Clare Hall and ran The Historical Study and Documentation of the Pad Gling Traditions in Bhutan project subsequently he spent years creating a digital archive of rare Bhutanese manuscripts. Dr. Phuntsho is the first Bhutanese to receive a D.Phil. from Oxford and the first Bhutanese to become an Oxbridge Fellow.  
In Bhutan he has founded the Loden Foundation, a charity to promote education and entrepreneurship in Bhutan as well as the Shejun Agency for Bhutan's Cultural Documentation and Research, which later was merged with the Loden Foundation.

Publications

Books

Articles

Monographs in Classical Tibetan (Choke)

Web

See also
 Loden Foundation

References

External links
Articles by Karma Phuntsho - at Open Democracy
About Dr. Karma Phuntsho
Interview in the Raven
 [The Loden Foundation]
 Shejun 

Religion academics
1968 births
Living people
Tibetologists
Bhutanese writers
Alumni of Balliol College, Oxford
People from Bumthang District